Jerald D. Johnson (August 16, 1927, in Curtis, Nebraska–April 28, 2020) was a minister and emeritus general superintendent in the Church of the Nazarene.

References
 Jerald D. Johnson. Church of the Nazarene. Accessed 2011-02-01.
 Celebrating the life, ministry of Jerald Johnson

1927 births
2020 deaths
American Nazarene ministers
Nazarene General Superintendents
People from Frontier County, Nebraska